Peter Symington Buchanan (13 October 1915 – 26 June 1977) was a Scottish footballer who played at both professional and international levels.

Career 
Buchanan played league football for Chelsea, Fulham and Brentford in The Football League, either side of the Second World War. During the war, Buchanan made guest appearances for several clubs including West Ham United, Southampton, for whom he made 11 appearances between 1942 and 1946, scoring twice, Aldershot, Portsmouth, Millwall, Crystal Palace and Fulham.

He earned one cap for Scotland, scoring in a 5–0 win against Czechoslovakia.

Personal life 
Buchanan was in a reserved occupation during the Second World War.

References

External links
London Hearts

1915 births
1977 deaths
Footballers from Glasgow
Scottish footballers
Association football wingers
Scotland international footballers
Chelsea F.C. players
Fulham F.C. players
Brentford F.C. players
Oxford United F.C. players
English Football League players
Aldershot F.C. wartime guest players
Clapton Orient F.C. wartime guest players
Fulham F.C. wartime guest players
Southampton F.C. wartime guest players
West Ham United F.C. wartime guest players
Crystal Palace F.C. wartime guest players
Millwall F.C. wartime guest players
Portsmouth F.C. wartime guest players
Southern Football League players
Wishaw Juniors F.C. players